The Gentleman Bandit retitled after theatrical release as Gentleman B., is a crime-drama film by producer-director Jordan Alan released in 2002.  It was based on the life story of real-life reformed thief Charles Mattera.

Plot
Brooklynite Nick and his childhood friend Manny grow up to become petty criminals. After Manny betrays him during a holdup, Nick goes to prison. Upon release, he visits his ex-girlfriend Maria in Los Angeles, where he learns the brutal, violent Manny has joined the police force and is divorced from Maria. Nick moves in with her and her 8-year-old daughter, Ally, and falls in with Maria's grandfatherly, ex-con landlord, Harry, who tries to groom Nick from his gruff ways. The two men come under police surveillance following a series of Beverly Hills bank robberies where the "gentleman bandit", as the press dubs him is a handsome, well-dressed man with a bandage on his nose.

Cast

Charlie Mattera ... Nick Vincent
Peter Greene ... Manny Breen
Ed Lauter ... Harry Koslow
Ryan O'Neal ... Bank manager
Justine Miceli ... Maria De Razio 
Kristina Malota ... Ally
Todd Newman ... Michael

Reception
The film received generally negative reviews, with Variety saying it "plays implausibly on screen, especially since Jordan Alan has no feel for authentic texture or volatility within the crime genre", The Hollywood Reporter calling it "minimal entertainment with nothing to recommend it," and New Times finding it "[t]edious, poorly acted and predictable." The Los Angeles Times, however, called it "[a] very good, satisfying B picture with a lot of A virtues."

References

External links

2002 films
Films directed by Jordan Alan
Films scored by Larry Groupé
2000s English-language films
2002 crime drama films